is a Japanese ice hockey player and member of the Japanese national ice hockey team, currently playing with DK Peregrine in the Women's Japan Ice Hockey League (WJIHL) and All-Japan Women's Ice Hockey Championship.

Otaki represented Japan at the 2021 IIHF Women's World Championship. She won a bronze medal in the women's ice hockey tournament  at the 2019 Winter Universiade. As a junior player with the Japanese national under-18 team, she participated in the 2015 IIHF Women's U18 World Championship and the 2016 IIHF Women's U18 World Championship – Division I, Group A.

References

External links 
 

Living people
1998 births
Sportspeople from Hokkaido
Japanese women's ice hockey forwards
Universiade medalists in ice hockey
Medalists at the 2019 Winter Universiade
Ice hockey players at the 2022 Winter Olympics
Olympic ice hockey players of Japan
Universiade bronze medalists for Japan